The Sunken Gardens was constructed during the winter of 1930-31 in Lincoln, Nebraska. 
It is the only garden in Nebraska listed in the National Geographic Guide to Public Gardens 300 Best Gardens to Visit in the United States and Canada.

History

Original Construction 
Construction of the gardens began in 1930 under the direction of Ernest M. Bair as a project for unemployed men during the Great Depression.  The land, which had previously been a neighborhood dumpsite for refuse, was donated by the locally-prominent Frey, Faulkner, and Seacrest families. 

At the time of its construction, the garden featured numerous rock and stone elements, in keeping with the trend of rock gardens at the time. As such, the garden was simply known as the "Rock Garden." Rocks were used to create terraced retaining walls, waterfalls, and water fountains. The project was completed in 1931 and the gardens opened with 416 trees and shrubs planted throughout the one and a half acres of land.

Renovation 
In 2003 renovation of the garden began and was completed in 2005.  The Lincoln Parks Foundation raised $1.7 million for the renovation and a partial endowment in a "Polishing a Gem" campaign.  The Foundation created the "One Flower Forever" and "Paving the Path" programs.  The programs allow people to support the gardens on an ongoing basis in honor of friends, loved ones, and special events.

The renovation included the addition of two new statues and construction of the Rotary Pavilion attached to the restrooms.  The original Rebekah at the Well statue by Ellis Burman was replaced by artist David Young’s “Rebekah at the Well." Dr. Wayne Southwick's statue “Reville” standing in the Healing Garden depicts his wife Ann getting the children out of bed and ready for the day.  The Rotary Pavilion includes a dome designed by architect Jeffrey Chadwick.  The dome is made of individual laser cut panels representing the four seasons of Lincoln’s skyline.

References

Gardens in Nebraska
Geography of Lincoln, Nebraska
Protected areas of Lancaster County, Nebraska
Tourist attractions in Lincoln, Nebraska